Joan Ruth Leitzel (née Phillips; born July 2, 1936) is an American mathematician and university administrator. She was the president of the University of New Hampshire from 1996 to 2002. She received the Charles Holmes Pettee Medal in 2002 for her contributions to the University of New Hampshire. She attended Hanover College (BA 1958), Brown University (AM 1961), and Indiana University (PhD 1965 in algebra under the supervision of ).

References

External links

University of New Hampshire: Office of the President
Full list of University Presidents (including interim Presidents) , University of New Hampshire Library
"Guide to the Joan Leitzel Papers, 1996-2002", University of New Hampshire Library

Living people
1936 births
Presidents of the University of New Hampshire
Hanover College alumni
Brown University alumni
Indiana University alumni
20th-century American mathematicians
Women mathematicians
Women heads of universities and colleges